The 1963–64 NBA season was the Hawks' 15th season in the NBA and 9th season in Saint Louis.

Regular season

Season standings 

x – clinched playoff spot

Record vs. opponents

Game log

Playoffs 

|- align="center" bgcolor="#ccffcc"
| 1
| March 21
| Los Angeles
| W 115–104
| Cliff Hagan (27)
| Bob Pettit (22)
| Hagan, Wilkens (7)
| Kiel Auditorium7,214
| 1–0
|- align="center" bgcolor="#ccffcc"
| 2
| March 22
| Los Angeles
| W 106–90
| Richie Guerin (22)
| Bob Pettit (18)
| Cliff Hagan (6)
| Kiel Auditorium7,014
| 2–0
|- align="center" bgcolor="#ffcccc"
| 3
| March 25
| @ Los Angeles
| L 105–107
| Bob Pettit (23)
| Bob Pettit (10)
| Cliff Hagan (5)
| Los Angeles Memorial Sports Arena11,728
| 2–1
|- align="center" bgcolor="#ffcccc"
| 4
| March 28
| @ Los Angeles
| L 88–97
| Bob Pettit (23)
| Bob Pettit (12)
| Lenny Wilkens (7)
| Los Angeles Memorial Sports Arena13,862
| 2–2
|- align="center" bgcolor="#ccffcc"
| 5
| March 30
| Los Angeles
| W 121–108
| Lenny Wilkens (30)
| Bob Pettit (20)
| Hagan, Guerin (6)
| Kiel Auditorium9,574
| 3–2
|-

|- align="center" bgcolor="#ccffcc"
| 1
| April 1
| @ San Francisco
| W 116–111
| Richie Guerin (32)
| Bill Bridges (12)
| Richie Guerin (7)
| Cow Palace5,231
| 1–0
|- align="center" bgcolor="#ffcccc"
| 2
| April 3
| @ San Francisco
| L 85–120
| Richie Guerin (23)
| Bob Pettit (15)
| Bridges, Wilkens (5)
| Cow Palace9,063
| 1–1
|- align="center" bgcolor="#ccffcc"
| 3
| April 5
| San Francisco
| W 113–109
| Bob Pettit (26)
| Bob Pettit (16)
| Bridges, Wilkens (5)
| Kiel Auditorium10,163
| 2–1
|- align="center" bgcolor="#ffcccc"
| 4
| April 8
| San Francisco
| L 109–111
| Bob Pettit (29)
| Bob Pettit (15)
| Lenny Wilkens (14)
| Kiel Auditorium10,118
| 2–2
|- align="center" bgcolor="#ffcccc"
| 5
| April 10
| @ San Francisco
| L 97–121
| Bob Pettit (19)
| Bob Pettit (11)
| Bridges, Guerin, Hagan, Vaughn (3)
| Cow Palace10,628
| 2–3
|- align="center" bgcolor="#ccffcc"
| 6
| April 12
| San Francisco
| W 123–95
| Bob Pettit (21)
| Bob Pettit (13)
| Cliff Hagan (9)
| Kiel Auditorium8,967
| 3–3
|- align="center" bgcolor="#ffcccc"
| 7
| April 16
| @ San Francisco
| L 95–105
| Bob Pettit (24)
| Bob Pettit (14)
| Cliff Hagan (5)
| Cow Palace8,923
| 3–4
|-

Awards and records 
 Bob Pettit: All-NBA First Team

References 

Atlanta Hawks seasons
St. Louis
St. Louis Hawks
St. Louis Hawks